Soslan Mairbekovich Ktsoev (Ossetian:Кцойты Мæирбеджы фырт Сослан,  ; born October 7, 1982, in Beslan) is a Russian male freestyle wrestler. He is bronze medalist Freestyle Wrestling World Championships 2010. European Champion 2009. Russian National champion 2010, 6 times Russian nationals bronze medalist.

References

External links
 bio on fila-wrestling.com

Living people
1982 births
Russian male sport wrestlers
World Wrestling Championships medalists
20th-century Russian people
21st-century Russian people